Louis Antonio Page (27 March 1899 – 11 October 1959) was an England international football player and football manager. His brothers Tom, Jack and Willie were also professional footballers.

He spent his youth with Everton and South Liverpool, before beginning his professional career with Stoke in 1919. After the "Potters" won promotion out of the Second Division, he moved on to Northampton Town in 1922. Three years later he moved up to the First Division with Burnley. He scored 111 goals in 248 league games for the "Clarets", before he was sold to Manchester United for a £1,000 fee in March 1932. Seven months later he moved on to Port Vale, before ending his playing career in the Football League in summer 1933.

He started his management career with Yeovil & Petters United, and led the club to the Southern League West Section and Western League Division 1 titles in 1934–35. He then returned to the Football League with Newport County. He later took charge at Glentoran, before he was put in charge at Swindon Town following the conclusion of World War II. He spent eight years in charge of the Third Division South club, before he spent three years in charge at Chester, who were struggling at the foot of the Third Division North table.

Early and personal life
Louis Antonio Page was born on 27 March 1899 in Bootle cum Linacre, Liverpool, Lancashire. He was the youngest of ten children to Robert William and Jane (née Galvin); his father was born in Calcutta and worked as a crane driver at the Liverpool docks. Three brothers – Tom, Jack and Willie – also played professional football. He married Lily Tinsley in 1920 and had six children: Lilian (born and died 1920), Louis (born 1921), Philimenia (born 1925), Mary (born and died 1928), Derek A. (born 1931) and Terence (born 1942).

Louis Page and his three brothers were all England baseball Internationals. Louis played in the annual International against Wales eight times between 1925 and 1933, 1928 being the exception, the last five as Captain.

Club career
Page began his senior career with Merseyside clubs Everton and South Liverpool. He entered professional football with Stoke during the 1919–20 season, scoring his first senior goal on 13 December, in a 2–1 defeat to Birmingham at St Andrew's. However, he featured just eight times in 1920–21 and then once in 1921–22, as the "Potters" won promotion out of the Second Division.

He left the Victoria Ground to sign with Northampton Town of the Third Division South. The "Cobblers" finished eighth in 1922–23 and 1923–24, and ninth in 1924–25. He scored 24 goals in 122 league games at the County Ground.

Page transferred to Burnley, who finished one place and one point above the First Division relegation zone in 1925–26. He wrote himself into the club's record books on 10 April 1926, when he scored six goals in a 7–1 win over Birmingham. He finished as the club's top scorer in 1925–26 with 26 goals. He scored 15 goals in 1926–27 to again become the club's top scorer, as the "Clarets" achieved a top five finish. They dropped to 19th in 1927–28, two places and one point above the relegation zone. They again finished 19th in 1928–29, but were this time seven points above the drop zone. Burnley were relegated in 1929–30, having attained a lower goal average than Sheffield United. They then finished eighth in the Second Division in 1930–31 and 19th in 1931–32. He made 248 league appearances, scoring 111 goals, during his time at Turf Moor.

Page joined Walter Crickmer's Second Division side Manchester United for a £1,000 fee in March 1932. He played nine games at the end of the 1931–32 season and three games at the start of the 1932–33 season, before falling out of favour under new secretary Scott Duncan and moving on to league rivals Port Vale in October 1932. He played 19 games in all competitions during the 1932–33 season, falling out of favour in March 1933. He was not kept on at The Old Recreation Ground beyond the campaign, and so Page left the Football League to forge a career in management.

International career
Page featured for England seven times in 1927, alongside England and Everton great Dixie Dean. He played four British Home Championship games and three friendlies, and scored against Belgium on 1 May 1927; his goal came in the 63rd minute, in what was a 9–1 victory.

Caps

Management career

Yeovil & Petters United
Page's first managerial post was with Yeovil & Petters United in summer 1933, also being registered as a player. He finished as the club's top scorer in 1933–34 with 23 goals. In the 1934–35 season, Yeovil topped both the Southern League West Section and Western League Division 1 tables.

Newport County
Page was appointed manager at Welsh club Newport County on 7 June 1935. The club finished 21st in the 22 team Third Division South in 1935–36, but successfully applied for re-election. Newport then moved up to 19th in the 1936–37 campaign, finishing two places and two points above the re-election zone. He was sacked on 9 September 1937, a few games into the 1937–38 season; his successor, Billy McCandless, led the club to a 16th-place finish in the Third Division South.

After leaving Newport he became trainer-coach at Glentoran in 1939–40, as the "Glens" finished third in the Irish League. He later served as manager of Liverpool-based Carlton F.C.

Swindon Town
When league football resumed after the Second World War, he was appointed manager of Swindon Town. Page was forced to build a completely fresh team, and so Swindon's fourth-place finish in the Third Division South in 1946–47 was seen as a highly respectable achievement. The "Robins" slumped to 16th place the following season – just two points off the bottom spot. They did though knock Burnley out of the FA Cup, before being beaten in the Fifth Round by Southampton. In 1948–49, Swindon again finished fourth, without ever challenging for the promotion spot.

Swindon then finished 14th in 1949–50, 17th in 1950–51, 16th in 1951–52, and 18th in 1952–53. Page always had to deal with a shoestring budget at the County Ground, and was forced to sell many of his top players. Page was relieved of his duties at the end of the 1952–53 season, and was handed £500 in compensation.

Chester
He became manager of Chester in 1953. The "Seals" finished bottom of the Third Division North in 1953–54. The Sealand Road outfit again finished last in 1954–55, before rising to 17th in 1955–56. He later worked as a scout for Leicester City.

Career statistics

Source:

Honours

As a player
Stoke
Football League Second Division second-place promotion: 1921–22

England
British Home Championship: 1926–27 (shared)

As player-manager
Yeovil & Petters United 
Southern League West Section: 1934–35
Western League Division 1: 1934–35
Somerset Premier Cup: 1935

References

1899 births
1959 deaths
Sportspeople from Bootle
Footballers from Liverpool
English footballers
England international footballers
Association football forwards
Everton F.C. players
South Liverpool F.C. players
Stoke City F.C. players
Northampton Town F.C. players
Burnley F.C. players
Manchester United F.C. players
Port Vale F.C. players
Yeovil Town F.C. players
English Football League players
Southern Football League players
Western Football League players
Association football player-managers
English football managers
Yeovil Town F.C. managers
Newport County A.F.C. managers
Glentoran F.C. managers
Swindon Town F.C. managers
Chester City F.C. managers
Southern Football League managers
English Football League managers
Association football coaches
Association football scouts
Leicester City F.C. non-playing staff